The deadlift is a weight training exercise in which a loaded barbell or bar is lifted off the ground to the level of the hips, torso perpendicular to the floor, before being placed back on the ground.  It is one of the three powerlifting exercises, along with the squat and bench press. 

Two styles of deadlift are commonly used in competition settings: the sumo deadlift and the standard deadlift. While both of these styles are permitted under the rules of powerlifting competition, only the conventional stance is used in strongman deadlifting contests.

Performing

Form

 
The conventional deadlift can be broken down into three parts: the setup, the initial pull or drive, and the lockout.

Setup: When performing a deadlift, a lifter sets in a position that eccentrically loads the gluteus maximus, gluteus minimus, biceps femoris, semitendinosus and semimembranosus while the muscles of the lumbar contract isometrically in an effort to stabilize the spine.
 Set behind the bar with it nearly touching the legs.
 Begin by hinging at the hips and knees, setting one's weight predominantly in the heels while maintaining flat feet.
 Maintain the spine long and straight as the hips hinge back, taking care not to allow the knees to track forwards over the toes.
 Grip the bar outside of the legs. It helps with grip strength to grab the bar with one hand facing forwards and the other facing backwards.
 Depress the shoulders away from the ears to load the lats and to generate force throughout the spinal erectors.

Drive: The next section of the deadlift produces the highest amount of force. By pushing down through their heels while simultaneously pushing up and forward with their hips and maintaining a depressed scapula and a long tense spine, an individual can remain safe during this motion. This is considered the most difficult part of the entire movement due to the amount of work required to drive the bar off the ground initially.

 Take a deep diaphragmatic breath and hold it in during the movement, creating an outward pressure on the core to further stabilize the lumbopelvic hip complex and core throughout the motion.
 Keep the muscles of the back contracted tightly in order to maintain a safe posture throughout the motion.
 Drive up and forward with the hips and legs to stand erect and lift the bar. 

Lockout: The finish is the most critical aspect of the motion. This requires being totally erect with a neutral spine and forceful hip extension to engage the muscles of the lumbar spine and abdomen in unison with the glutes.

 Drive the hips completely into the bar.
 Contract the glutei and the rectus abdominis to finish the movement with the pelvis in a neutral position. Contracting the glutes as well as the abdominal muscles is critical for lower back health and safety.

Lowering the weight: Performing the above steps in reverse order. As the muscles of the back and core must remain tight throughout the motion, one should simply hinge at the hips and knees to bring the weight down. Lowering the chest towards the knees while keeping the bar close is the safest way to complete the motion.

Common errors
There are a few common errors during the performance of the deadlift. Protracting the shoulders disengages the back muscles which stabilize the spine. Slack should be taken from the bar prior to the lift, by squeezing the back muscles first and straightening the arms; the bar should then be lifted in a smooth motion without jerking. As the objective of a deadlift is to hinge the hips, the knees should not be bent so deeply as to form a squat. If the bar is too far from the lifter, the lifter may compensate by rounding the back or shifting the weight to the front of the foot. Both result in shifting which muscles are used and could cause injury. Rounding the back in general is controversial; it is often recommended that during the lift, the back is flat with a spine neutral. Some lifters prefer to slightly round their back; but an excessively rounded back may result in the load being lifted awkwardly and placing too much stress or pressure on the back, which may lead to injury. The knees should be bent more fully on the descent of the bar to preserve a neutral spine.

Weights

Deadlifts can be performed using dumbbells, barbells, or kettlebells with one hand or two hands, and with one leg or two legs. Other variations are the side deadlift or suitcase deadlift, rack pulls, deadlift lockouts, deficit deadlift or deadlift from a box (pulling from the floor while standing on a built or improvised low platform).

Each of these variations is called for to address specific weaknesses in a lifter's overall deadlift. For instance, if the athlete has difficulty breaking contact at max weight, deficit deadlifts are performed to strengthen the gluteus maximus and hamstrings due to the greater range of motion required by standing on the low platform or low box. On the other hand, if the lifter has no problem with breaking contact with the floor but has difficulty locking out, they should perform rack pulls to strengthen their upper back, posterior deltoids, and trapezius muscles while de-emphasizing the gluteus and hamstrings.

Grips

Typically, there are three grips used: overhand (pronated), a mixed overhand-underhand (supinated) (sometimes called "offset," "staggered," "alternating", or "mixed") grip, or a hook grip. Depending on forearm strength, the overhand grip may result in the bar potentially rolling about. Mixed grip is capable of neutralizing this through the "physics of reverse torsion." The mixed grip allows more weight to be held for this reason.

In order to prevent the bar from rolling out of the hands, some lifters have been known to use an Olympic weightlifting technique known as the hook grip. This is similar to an overhand grip, but the thumbs are inside, allowing the lifter to "hook" onto them with the fingers. The hook grip can make it easier to hold heavier weights using less grip strength, and keeps both shoulders and elbows in a symmetrical position. While it theoretically takes much of the stress off the joints which might be created by the twisting of a mixed grip, it has the disadvantage of being extremely uncomfortable for the thumbs, something which those who advocate it says will pass once a lifter becomes accustomed to it. Another, but rarely used method is a combination of the mixed overhand-underhand grip and the hook grip, preferred by people who lift heavier weights than their grip can handle, but who don't want to rely on lifting straps or other supportive gear.

Many powerlifters adopt the overhand grip for their lower weight sets and move to the mixed grip to lift larger weights so they can achieve their one rep max.

A neutral grip can be achieved by the use of a trap bar; which is a hexagonal shaped bar which the lifter stands inside whilst holding the two side handles. The neutral grip provides the lifter with slightly different posturing which can help reduce the risk of injury.

Muscles involved
A barbell deadlift is a compound exercise and works the gluteus maximus with further work on the quadriceps femoris, hamstrings, trapezius, lats, and erector spinae. The quadriceps, hamstrings, adductor magnus, and soleus serve as synergists during the exercise.

Equipment
A deadlift suit is a special piece of powerlifting assistance clothing. The suits are made from very tight material. The material tightens on the squat on the way down, storing energy, that gives an extra boost with the stored tension to lift up. Thus, records are recorded with and without the suit. The starting position with a suit is slightly different to maximize use, so training with a suit is different. Wrist wraps are sometimes used to provide support, not necessarily to increase the weight lifted, as a suit does.

Straps can help in a deadlift in case of a weak grip. Figure 8 straps are allowed in some strongman competitions. They allow the lifter to hold the bar in their fingertips and can reduce the distance travelled by over an inch.

Chains and thick elastic bands can be attached to either end of the barbell in order to increase or decrease resistance at different phases of the lift. This is known as a variable resistance deadlift.

World Records

Men:
 Standard Bar Deadlift (with deadlift suit & straps) -  by Hafþór Júlíus Björnsson  (2020)
 Standard Bar Raw Deadlift (no deadlift suit or straps) -  by Benedikt Magnússon   (2011)
 Standard Bar Raw Sumo Deadlift (no deadlift suit or straps) - 487.5 kg (1,075 lb) by Danny Grigsby  (2022)
 Elephant Bar Deadlift (Raw with straps) -  by Hafþór Júlíus Björnsson  (2019)
 Hummer Tire Deadlift (from 15" height) (with deadlift suit & straps) -  by Oleksii Novikov  (2022)
 Silver Dollar Deadlift (from 18" height) (with deadlift suit & straps) - 580 kg (1,279 lb) by Rauno Heinla  (2022)

Women:
 Standard Bar Deadlift (with deadlift suit & straps) -  by Becca Swanson  (2005)
 Standard Bar Raw Deadlift (no deadlift suit or straps) -  by Becca Swanson  (2006)
 Elephant Bar Deadlift -  Raw by Tamara Walcott , with straps by Victoria Long  (2023)
 Hummer Tire Deadlift (from 15" height) (with suit & straps) -  by Andrea Thompson  (2022)

Notes

References

Further reading
 Mark Rippetoe with Lon Kilgore, Starting Strength, The Aasgaard Company Publishers, 2005, 
 Frédéric Delavier, Strength Training Anatomy, Human Kinetics, 2001,

External links

Deadlift Technique Reference Photos

Powerlifting
Weight training exercises
Physical exercise